Puerto Ricans (also colloquially known as Boricuas) are the people of Puerto Rico, the inhabitants, and citizens of the Commonwealth of Puerto Rico and their descendants.

Overview

The culture held in common by most Puerto Ricans is referred to as a Western culture largely derived from the traditions of Spain, and more specifically Andalusia and the Canary Islands.  Puerto Rico has also received immigration from other parts of Spain such as Catalonia as well as from other European countries such as France, Ireland, Italy and Germany. Puerto Rico has also been influenced by African culture, with many Puerto Ricans partially descended from Africans, though Afro-Puerto Ricans of unmixed African descent are only a significant minority. Also present in today's Puerto Ricans are traces (about 10-15%) of the aboriginal Taino natives that inhabited the island at the time European colonizers arrived in 1493. Recent studies in population genetics have concluded that Puerto Rican gene pool is on average predominantly European, with a significant Sub-Saharan African, North African Guanche, and Indigenous American substrate, the latter two originating in the aboriginal people of the Canary Islands and Puerto Rico's pre-Columbian Taíno inhabitants, respectively.

The population of Puerto Ricans and descendants is estimated to be between 8 and 10 million worldwide, with most living on the islands of Puerto Rico and in the United States mainland. Within the United States, Puerto Ricans are present in all states of the Union, and the states with the largest populations of Puerto Ricans relative to the national population of Puerto Ricans in the United States at large are the states of New York, Florida, New Jersey, and Pennsylvania, with large populations also in Massachusetts, Connecticut, California, Illinois, and Texas.

For 2009, the American Community Survey estimates give a total of 3,859,026 Puerto Ricans classified as "Native" Puerto Ricans. It also gives a total of 3,644,515 (91.9%) of the population being born in Puerto Rico and 201,310 (5.1%) born in the United States. The total population born outside Puerto Rico is 322,773 (8.1%). Of the 108,262 who were foreign born outside the United States (2.7% of Puerto Ricans), 92.9% were born in Latin America, 3.8% in Europe, 2.7% in Asia, 0.2% in Northern America, and 0.1% in Africa and Oceania each.

Number of Puerto Ricans

Population (1765–1897)
The populations during Spanish rule of Puerto Rico were:

Current populations and their racial makeup

Ancestry

The original inhabitants of Puerto Rico are the Taíno, who called the island Borikén; however, as in other parts of the Americas, the native people soon diminished in number after the arrival of Spanish settlers. Besides miscegenation, the negative impact on the numbers of Amerindian people, especially in Puerto Rico, was almost entirely the result of Old World diseases that the Amerindians had no natural/bodily defenses against, including measles, chicken pox, mumps, influenza, and even the common cold. In fact, it was estimated that the majority of all the Amerindian inhabitants of the New World died out due to contact and contamination with those Old World diseases, while those that survived were further reduced through deaths by warfare with each other and with Europeans.

Thousands of Spanish settlers also immigrated to Puerto Rico from the Canary Islands during the 18th and 19th centuries, so many so that whole Puerto Rican villages and towns were founded by Canarian immigrants, and their descendants would later form a majority of the population on the island.

In 1791, the slaves in Saint-Domingue (Haiti), revolted against their French masters. Many of the French escaped to Puerto Rico via what is now the Dominican Republic and settled in the west coast of the island, especially in Mayagüez. Some Puerto Ricans are of British heritage, most notably Scottish people and English people who came to reside there in the 17th and 18th centuries.

When Spain revived the Royal Decree of Graces of 1815 with the intention of attracting non-Hispanics to settle in the island, thousands of Corsicans (though the island was French since 1768 the population spoke an Italian dialect similar to Tuscan Italian) during the 19th century immigrated to Puerto Rico, along with German immigrants as well as Irish immigrants who were affected by the Great Famine of the 1840s, immigrated to Puerto Rico. They were followed by smaller waves from other European countries and China.

During the early 20th century Jews began to settle in Puerto Rico. The first large group of Jews to settle in Puerto Rico were European refugees fleeing German–occupied Europe in the 1930s and 1940s. The second influx of Jews to the island came in the 1950s, when thousands of Cuban Jews fled Cuba after Fidel Castro came to power.

Ethnogenesis
The native Taino population began to dwindle, with the arrival of the Spanish in the 16th century, through disease and intermarriage. Many Spaniard men took Taino and West African wives and in the first centuries of the Spanish colonial period the island was overwhelmingly racially mixed. "By 1530 there were 14 native women married to Spaniards, not to mention Spaniards with concubines." Under Spanish rule, mass immigration shifted the ethnic make-up of the island, as a result of the Royal Decree of Graces of 1815. Puerto Rico went from being two-thirds black and mulatto in the beginning of the 19th century, to being nearly 80% white by the middle of the 20th century. This was compounded by more flexible attitudes to race under Spanish rule, as epitomized by the Regla del Sacar. Under Spanish rule, Puerto Rico had laws such as Regla del Sacar or Gracias al Sacar, which allowed persons of mixed ancestry to pay a fee to be classified as white, which was the opposite of "one-drop rule" in US society after the American Civil War.

Studies have shown that the racial ancestry mixture of the average Puerto Rican (regardless of racial self-identity) is about 64% European, 21% African, and 15% Native Taino, with European ancestry strongest on the west side of the island and West African ancestry strongest on the east side, and the levels of Taino ancestry (which, according to some research, ranges from about 5%-35%) generally highest in the southwest of the island.

A study of a sample of 96 healthy self-identified White Puerto Ricans and self-identified Black Puerto Ricans in the U.S. showed that, although all carried a contribution from all 3 ancestral populations (European, African, and Amerindian), the proportions showed significant variation. Depending on individuals, although often correlating with their self-identified race, African ancestry ranged from less than 10% to over 50%, while European ancestry ranged from under 20% to over 80%. Amerindian ancestry showed less fluctuation, generally hovering between 5% and 20% irrespective of self-identified race.

Self-identified race

White

In the 1899 census, taken the year Spain ceded Puerto Rico to the United States following its invasion and annexation in the Spanish–American War, 61.8% of the people were identified as White. In the 2010 United States Census the total of Puerto Ricans that self-identified as White was 75.8% or 2,825,100 out of the 3,725,789 people living in Puerto Rico. down from 80.5% in the 2000 Census.

The European ancestry of Puerto Ricans comes primarily from one source: Spaniards (including Canarians, Catalans, Castilians, Galicians, Asturians, Andalusians, and Basques).
The Canarian cultural influence in Puerto Rico is one of the most important components in which many villages were founded from these immigrants, which started from 1493 to 1890 and beyond. Many Spaniards, especially Canarians, chose Puerto Rico because of its Hispanic ties and relative proximity in comparison with other former Spanish colonies. They searched for security and stability in an environment similar to that of the Canary Islands and Puerto Rico was the most suitable. This began as a temporary exile which became a permanent relocation and the last significant wave of Spanish or European migration to Puerto Rico.

Other sources of European populations are Corsicans, French, Italians, Portuguese (especially Azoreans), Greeks, Germans, Irish, Scots, Maltese, Dutch, English, and Danes.

Black

In the 2010 United States Census, 12.4% of people self-identified as Black. Africans were brought by Spanish Conquistadors. The vast majority of the Africans who were brought to Puerto Rico did so as a result of the slave trade taking place from many groups in the African continent, but particularly the West Africans, the Yoruba, the Igbo, and the Kongo people.

Indigenous

Indigenous people make up the third largest racial identity among Puerto Ricans, comprising 0.5% of the population. Although this self-identification may be ethno-political in nature since unmixed Tainos no longer exist as a discrete genetic population. Native American admixture in Puerto Ricans ranges between about 5% and 35%, with around 15% being the approximate average.

Puerto Rico's self-identified indigenous population therefore consist mostly of indigenous-identified persons (oftentimes with predominant Indigenous ancestry, but not always) from within the genetically mestizo population of mixed European and Amerindian ancestry, even when most other Puerto Ricans of their exact same mixture would identify either as mixed-race or even as white.

Asian

For its 2010 census, the U.S. Census Bureau listed the following groups to constitute "Asian": Asian Indian, Bangladeshi, Bhutanese, Cambodian, Chinese, Filipino, Hmong, Indonesian, Japanese, Korean, Laotian, Malaysian, Nepalese, Pakistani, Sri Lankan, Taiwanese, Thai, Vietnamese, and Other Asian. Though, the largest groups come from China and India. These groups represented 0.2% of the population.

Other

People of "Some other race alone" or "Two or more races" constituted 11.1% of the population in the 2010 Census.

Although the average Puerto Rican is of mixed-race, few actually identify as multiracial ("two or more races"); only 3.3% did so in the 2010 Census. They more often
self-identify with their predominant heritage or phenotype. Most have significant ancestry from two or more of the founding source populations of Spaniards, Africans, and Tainos, although Spanish ancestry is predominant in a majority of the population. According to the National Geographic Genographic Project, "the average Puerto Rican individual carries 12% Native American, 65% West Eurasian (Mediterranean, Northern European and/or Middle Eastern) and 20% Sub-Saharan African DNA."

In genetic terms, even many of those of pure Spanish origin would have North and, in some cases, West African ancestry brought from founder populations, particularly in the Canary Islands. Very few self-identified Black Puerto Ricans are of unmixed African ancestry, while a genetically unmixed Amerindian population in Puerto Rico is technically extinct despite a minuscule segment of self-identified Amerindian Puerto Ricans due to a minor Amerindian component in their ancestral mixture. Research data shows that 60% of Puerto Ricans carry maternal lineages of Native American origin and the typical Puerto Rican has between 5% and 15% Native American admixture.

Modern identity

The Puerto Rico of today has come to form some of its own social customs, cultural matrix, historically rooted traditions, and its own unique pronunciation, vocabulary, and idiomatic expressions within the Spanish language, known as Puerto Rican Spanish. Even after the attempted assimilation of Puerto Rico into the United States in the early 20th century, the majority of the people of Puerto Rico feel pride in their Puerto Rican nationality, regardless of the individual's particular racial, ethnic, political, or economic background. Many Puerto Ricans are consciously aware of the rich contribution of all cultures represented on the island. This diversity can be seen in the everyday lifestyle of many Puerto Ricans such as the profound Latin, African, and Taíno influences regarding food, music, dance, and architecture.

Emigration

During the Spanish colonial period, there was significant migration from Puerto Rico to Santo Domingo (DR), Cuba, the Virgin Islands, and Venezuela, and vice versa, because migration between neighboring colonies especially under the same European power, was common. Nearly all Puerto Ricans who migrated to these areas during these times, assimilated and intermixed with the local populations. In the early days of US rule, from 1900 to the 1940s, the Puerto Rican economy was small and undeveloped, it relied heavily on agriculture. At this time, Puerto Rican migration waves were mainly to Dominican Republic, the Virgin Islands, and US cities such as Boston, Philadelphia, Baltimore, Miami, New Orleans, and most importantly metropolitan area surrounding New York City and North Jersey. Over 5,000 Puerto Ricans migrated to Hawaii from 1900 to 1901. Puerto Rican migration to the US northeast started as early as the 1890s, however it was a very, very small flow at the time. During the 1940s, Puerto Rican desire for independence slowly started to decline while desire for statehood and dependence on the US started rise, due to this more Puerto Ricans started to look at the US more favorably and take full advantage of their US citizenship, huge flows of Puerto Ricans started to arrive in the United States, particularly industrial cities in the Northeast and Midwest, coinciding with a strong decline in Puerto Ricans migrating to other countries and even other areas in the US like Baltimore, New Orleans, and Hawaii. From 1940 to 1960, the stateside Puerto Rican population rose from 69,967 to 892,513.

In the modern day, there are about 5.9 million Puerto Ricans in the US mainland. Large concentrations can be found in the Northeast region and in Florida, in the metropolitan areas of New York, Orlando, Philadelphia, Miami, Chicago, Tampa, and Boston, among others. Though, over 95% of Puerto Ricans living outside of Puerto Rico, live in the United States (US states), there is a significant and growing number of Puerto Ricans, mainly from Puerto Rico itself but to a lesser degree stateside Puerto Ricans as well, living outside the 50 States and the US territory of Puerto Rico. Puerto Rican populations in other countries are very small, not large enough to have dominance over certain neighborhoods and cities like in Florida and the US Northeast. Unsurprisingly, Puerto Rico's neighbors have the biggest Puerto Rican communities outside Puerto Rico and the US mainland, to the west Dominican Republic with 15,763, and to the east US Virgin Islands with 10,981, 10.3% of the territory's population, second highest percentage of any US state or territory, after Puerto Rico (95.7%) and before Connecticut (8.2%). There are small numbers of Puerto Ricans in other countries like Canada, Spain, Mexico, United Kingdom, and other countries in Europe and the Caribbean/Latin America.

Language
Spanish and English are the official languages of the entire Commonwealth. A 1902 English-only language law was abolished on April 5, 1991. Then on January 28, 1993, the Legislative Assembly of Puerto Rico approved Law Number 1 again making Spanish and English the official languages of Puerto Rico. All official business of the U.S. District Court for the District of Puerto Rico is conducted in English. The official languages of the executive branch of government of Puerto Rico are Spanish and English, with Spanish being the primary language. English is the primary language of less than 10% of the population.

Puerto Rican Spanish is the dominant language of business, education and daily life on the island. The US Census Bureau's 2015 update provides the following: 94.1% of adults speak Spanish, 5.8% speak only English and little to no Spanish, 78.3% do not speak English "very well", 15.8% are fully bilingual in both English and Spanish, 0.1% speak other languages.

Public school instruction in Puerto Rico is conducted almost entirely in Spanish. There have been pilot programs in about a dozen of the over 1,400 public schools aimed at conducting instruction in English only. Objections from teaching staff are common, perhaps because many of them are not fully fluent in English. English is taught as a second language and is a compulsory subject from elementary levels to high school.

Home to a sizeable deaf community, the actual numbers are unknown due to unavailable source data. A 1986 estimate places the Puerto Rican deaf population to be between 8,000 and 40,000. Due to ongoing colonization from the US mainland, the larger American Sign Language (ASL) is supplanting the local Puerto Rican Sign Language (PRSL, also known as LSPR: Lenguaje de Señas Puertorriqueño). Although assumed to be a dialect or variant of ASL, it is currently unknown the degree of mutual intelligibility between Puerto Rican Sign Language nor whether it is even a Francosign language like ASL. Indeed, there is a hesitancy amongst Puerto Rican Deaf to even mention LSPR after heavy handed oralist education of English, Spanish, and Signed English. Today, there is much contact between ASL, PRSL, and Signed Spanish.

The Spanish of Puerto Rico has evolved into having many idiosyncrasies in vocabulary and syntax that differentiate it from the Spanish spoken elsewhere. While the Spanish spoken in all Iberian, Mediterranean and Atlantic Spanish Maritime Provinces was brought to the island over the centuries, the most profound regional influence on the Spanish spoken in Puerto Rico has been from that spoken in the present-day Canary Islands. The Spanish of Puerto Rico also includes occasional Taíno words, typically in the context of vegetation, natural phenomena or primitive musical instruments. Similarly, words attributed to primarily West African languages were adopted in the contexts of foods, music or dances.

Religion
There are many religious beliefs represented in the island. Religious breakdown in Puerto Rico (as of 2006) is given in the table on the right.

The majority of Puerto Ricans in the island are Christians. Spiritists have a large secondary following. Muslims, Hindus, Jews, and Buddhists all have a small presence as well. Roman Catholicism has been the main Christian denomination among Puerto Ricans since the arrival of the Spanish in the 15th century, but the presence of Protestant, Mormon, Pentecostal, and Jehovah's Witnesses denominations has increased under U.S. sovereignty, making modern Puerto Rico an inter-denominational, multi-religious community. The Afro-Caribbean religion Santería is also practiced.

In 1998, a news report stated that "Puerto Rico [was] no longer predominantly Catholic". Pollster Pablo Ramos wrote that the population was 38% Roman Catholic, 28% Pentecostal, and 18% were members of independent churches. However, an Associated Press article in March 2014 stated that "more than 70 percent of [Puerto Ricans] identify themselves as Catholic". The CIA World Factbook reports that 85% of the population of Puerto Rico identifies as Roman Catholic, while 15% identify as Protestant and Other.

Political and international status

Puerto Ricans became citizens of the United States as a result of the passage of the Jones–Shafroth Act of 1917. Since this law was the result of Congressional legislation, and not the result of an amendment to the United States Constitution, the current U.S. citizenship of Puerto Ricans can be revoked by Congress, as they are statutory citizens, not 14th Amendment citizens. The Jones Act established that Puerto Ricans born prior to 1899 were considered naturalized citizens of Puerto Rico, and anyone born after 1898 were U.S. citizens, unless the Puerto Rican expressed his/her intentions to remain a Spanish subject. Since 1948, it was decided by Congress that all Puerto Ricans, whether born within the United States or in Puerto Rico, were naturally born United States citizens.

Puerto Ricans and other U.S. citizens residing in Puerto Rico cannot vote in presidential elections as that is a right reserved by the U.S. Constitution to admitted states and the District of Columbia through the Electoral College system. Nevertheless, both the Democratic Party and Republican Party, while not fielding candidates for public office in Puerto Rico, provide the islands with state-sized voting delegations at their presidential nominating conventions. Delegate selection processes frequently have resulted in presidential primaries being held in Puerto Rico. U.S. citizens residing in Puerto Rico do not elect U.S. representatives or senators. However, Puerto Rico is represented in the House of Representatives by an elected representative commonly known as the Resident Commissioner, who has the same duties and obligations as a representative, with the exception of being able to cast votes on the final disposition of legislation on the House floor. The Resident Commissioner is elected by Puerto Ricans to a four-year term and does serve on congressional committee. Puerto Ricans residing in the U.S. states have all rights and privileges of other U.S. citizens living in the states.

As statutory U.S. citizens, Puerto Ricans born in Puerto Rico may enlist in the U.S. military and have been included in the compulsory draft when it has been in effect. Puerto Ricans have fully participated in all U.S. wars and military conflicts since 1898, including World War I, World War II, the Korean War, the Vietnam War, the Gulf War, the War in Afghanistan, and the Iraq War.

Since 2007, the Puerto Rico State Department has developed a protocol to issue certificates of Puerto Rican citizenship to Puerto Ricans. In order to be eligible, applicants must have been born in Puerto Rico; born outside of Puerto Rico to a Puerto Rican-born parent; or be an American citizen with at least one year residence in Puerto Rico. The citizenship is internationally recognized by Spain, which considers Puerto Rico to be an Ibero-American nation. Therefore, Puerto Rican citizens have the ability to apply for Spanish citizenship after only two years residency in Spain (instead of the standard 10 years).

Decolonization and status referendums
Since 1953, the UN has been considering the political status of Puerto Rico and how to assist it in achieving "independence" or "decolonization." In 1978, the Special Committee determined that a "colonial relationship" existed between the US and Puerto Rico.

The UN's Special Committee has referred often to Puerto Rico as a nation in its reports, because, internationally, the people of Puerto Rico are often considered to be a Caribbean nation with their own national identity. Most recently, in a June 2016 report, the Special Committee called for the United States to expedite the process to allow self-determination in Puerto Rico. More specifically, the group called on the United States to expedite a process that would allow the people of Puerto Rico to exercise fully their right to self-determination and independence. ... allow the Puerto Rican people to take decisions in a sovereign manner, and to address their urgent economic and social needs, including unemployment, marginalization, insolvency and poverty".

Puerto Rico has held four referendums to determine whether to retain its status as a territory or to switch to some other status such as statehood. The fourth, the Puerto Rican status referendum, 2012 occurred on November 6, 2012. The result a 54% majority of the ballots cast against the continuation of the island's territorial political status, and in favor of a new status. Of votes for new status, a 61.1% majority chose statehood. This was by far the most successful referendum for statehood advocates. In all earlier referendum, votes for statehood were matched almost equally by votes for remaining an American territory, with the remainder for independence. Support for U.S. statehood has risen in each successive popular referendum.

The fifth Puerto Rican status referendum of 2017, was held on June 11, 2017, and offered three options: "Statehood", "Independence/Free Association", and "Current Territorial Status." With 23% of registered voters casting ballots, 97% voted for statehood. Benefits of statehood would include an additional $10 billion per year in federal funds, the right to vote in presidential elections, higher Social Security and Medicare benefits, and a right for its government agencies and municipalities to file for bankruptcy. The latter is currently prohibited.

Even with the Puerto Ricans' vote for statehood, action by the United States Congress would be necessary to implement changes to the status of Puerto Rico under the Territorial Clause of the United States Constitution.

See also

 Demographics of Puerto Rico
 Hispanics
 History of Puerto Rico
 History of Puerto Ricans
 History of women in Puerto Rico
 List of Puerto Rican Presidential Citizens Medal recipients
 List of Puerto Rican Presidential Medal of Freedom recipients
 List of Puerto Ricans
 List of Stateside Puerto Ricans
 Military history of Puerto Rico
 Nuyoricans
 Puerto Rican citizenship
 Puerto Rican migration to New York
 Puerto Rican status referendum, 2017
 Puerto Ricans in the United States

References

Further reading
 "Adiós, Borinquen querida": The Puerto Rican Diaspora, Its History, and Contributions, by Edna Acosta-Belen, et al. (Albany, New York: Center for Latino, Latin American, and Caribbean Studies, SUNY-Albany, 2000)
 Boricua Hawaiiana: Puerto Ricans of Hawaii—Reflections of the Past and Mirrors of the Future, by Blase Camacho Souza (Honolulu: Puerto Rican Heritage Society of Hawaii, 1982)
 Boricua Literature: A Literary History of the Puerto Rican Diaspora, by Lisa Sénchez González (New York: New York University Press, 2001)
 Boricua Pop: Puerto Ricans and the Latinization of American Culture, by Frances Negrón-Muntaner (New York: New York University Press, 2004)
 Yo soy Boricua in "United States of Banana", by Giannina Braschi (AmazonCrossing, 2011)
 Boricuas: Influential Puerto Rican Writings, by Roberto Santiago (New York: One World, 1995)
 Boricuas in Gotham: Puerto Ricans in the Making of Modern New York City, edited by Gabriel Haslip-Viera, Angelo Falcón and Félix Matos Rodríguez (Princeton: Markus Wiener Publishers, 2004)
 Taino-tribe.org, PR Taíno DNA study

External links 
 

 
Cultural history of Puerto Rico
Puerto Rican culture
Society of Puerto Rico
Social history of Puerto Rico
Multiracial ethnic groups in the United States